is a retired professional Japanese baseball player. He played infielder for the Chiba Lotte Marines.

His elder brother Yuta is also a professional baseball player currently playing for Marines.

External links

 NPB.com

1991 births
Living people
Baseball people from Okinawa Prefecture
Japanese baseball players
Nippon Professional Baseball infielders
Chiba Lotte Marines players